Nolina nelsonii (Blue Nolina or Nelson's Bear Grass), often misspelled Nolina nelsoni, is a flowering plant in the genus Nolina.  The species was first described in 1906; in its genus, it is morphologically most similar to Nolina parryi.  This extremely drought-tolerant plant is native to the deserts and montane regions in the State of Tamaulipas in northern/northeastern Mexico.  It is known to be cold-hardy to at least −12 °C.  It develops a trunk measuring from one to several meters high, making it an arborescent member of its genus.  The bluish-green leaves, with finely toothed margins, are borne in dense rosettes, each with up to several hundred stiff linear (narrow) leaves up to 70 centimeters long. It is dioecious; upon reaching sexual maturity, its white-flowered inflorescence appears in Spring.  The fruit capsules are around 80 mm in length, containing light-brown, spherical to oblong seeds 2–3 mm in diameter.  After blooming, the plant's main trunk dies and multiple lateral trunks emerge to take its place.

References

External links
Several photos in habitat (2005)

nelsonii
Flora of Tamaulipas
North American desert flora
Plants described in 1906